Yalden is a surname. The name is derived from the prefix Y- being added to the name Alden.

Notable people with this surname includes:

 Derek Yalden, (1940–2013), English zoologist and honorary reader at the University of Manchester;
 Max Yalden (born 1930), Canadian civil servant and diplomat;
 Thomas Yalden (1670–1736), English poet and translator; and
 William Yalden (1740–1824), English cricketer.

References